is a railway station in Saiki, Ōita, Japan. It is operated by JR Kyushu and is on the Nippō Main Line.

Lines

Layout 
The station, which is not staffed, consists of a side and an island platform serving three tracks. A siding branches off track 1, ending on the other side of the side platform. There is no station building, but a wooden shed in traditional Japanese style has been set up as a waiting room. Access to the island platform is by means of a footbridge.

Adjacent stations

History
The Kyushu Railway was nationalised on 1 July 1907. Japanese Government Railways (JGR), designated the track as the Hōshū Main Line on 12 October 1909 and expanded it southwards in phases over the next 13 years, establishing Shigeoka as its southern terminus on 26 March 1922. The entire stretch of track was then renamed the Nippō Main Line. With the privatization of Japanese National Railways (JNR), the successor of JGR, on 1 April 1987, the station came under the control of JR Kyushu.

Passenger statistics
In fiscal 2015, there were a total of 5,978 boarding passengers, giving a daily average of 16 passengers.

See also
List of railway stations in Japan

References

External links 

Shigeoka (JR Kyushu)

Railway stations in Ōita Prefecture
Railway stations in Japan opened in 1922